Joseph Hardin Coulombe (June 3, 1930 – February 28, 2020) was an American entrepreneur. He founded the grocery store chain Trader Joe's in 1967 and ran it until his retirement in 1988.

Early life and education
Coulombe was born in San Diego, California, and grew up on an avocado farm in nearby Del Mar. After serving a year in the U.S. Air Force, he attended Stanford University, where he earned a bachelor's degree in economics in 1952 and a Master of Business Administration degree in 1954. Coulombe was a member of Alpha Kappa Lambda.

Career 
Coulombe started his career at Rexall, a chain of American drugstores. In 1958, he was asked to test the launch of Pronto Markets, a store brand to compete against 7-Eleven. After running six Pronto Markets in the Los Angeles area, Rexall asked Coulombe to liquidate them; he decided to buy them out instead. In 1967, Coulombe changed the name Pronto Markets to Trader Joe's. He led the chain to success and sold it in 1979 to German billionaire Theo Albrecht, co-founder of the Aldi supermarket chain. Coulombe continued with Trader Joe's as chief executive officer until retiring in 1988.

Coulombe served on the corporate boards of Cost Plus World Market, Bristol Farms, True Religion, and Imperial Bank.

Personal life and death 
In 1952, Coulombe married Alice Steere, whom he met at a party while they were students at Stanford. Alice served on the board and is a life trustee of the Los Angeles Opera. They had three children, Joe, Charlotte, and Madeleine. Coulombe and his family lived in Pasadena, California.

Coulombe was a board member of the Huntington Library, the Colburn School, and the Los Angeles Opera.

On February 28, 2020, Coulombe died at his home in Pasadena. He was 89 years old.

References

External links 
 

1930 births
2020 deaths
20th-century American businesspeople
American food industry business executives
American grocers
Businesspeople from San Diego
People from Pasadena, California
Stanford Graduate School of Business alumni
Stanford University alumni
Trader Joe's
United States Air Force airmen